Svetaketu, also spelt Shvetaketu, was a sage and he is mentioned in the Chandogya Upanishad. He was the son of sage Uddalaka, whose real name was Aruni, and represents the quintessential seeker of knowledge. The Upanishads entail the journey of Svetaketu from ignorance to knowledge of the self and truth (sat).

In the Mahabharata, Svetaketu is credited for creating the practice of the "wife being loyal to one husband for life" after observing a brahmana catching his mother's hand (unintentionally) in front of his father.

The case of Svetaketu appears in three principal (mukhya) Upanishads, namely, the Brhadaranyaka Upanishad S. 6.2.1 to 6.2.8, Chandogya Upanishad S.5.3 and in the Kausitaki S.1. Svetaketu is the recipient of the knowledge enshrined in the mahavakya which appears in the sixteen chapters of the 6th section (Prapathaka) of the Chandogya Upanishad.

First Reincarnation Story 
Svetaketu's story in the Chandogya Upanishad is the first time that reincarnation is mentioned in the Vedas and perhaps in all of the known writings in human history. In the story, Svetaketu returns home from studying and his childhood friends ask him what he learned about the afterlife, to which he replies it was not part of his curriculum. They ask Svetaketu's father and he also does not know, so they ask the king, who claims to have known all along and explained the concept of reincarnation. He adds that it is a common belief among the Kshatriya (warrior and administrative class) and from this belief, they draw their power (courage in battle).

References

Further reading 
 
 The Mahabharata of Krishna Dwaipayana Vyasa, by Kisari Mohan Ganguli Volume 1, location 5060
 S. Radhakrishnan, The Principal Upanishads
 Sri Aurobindo, The Upanishads . Sri Aurobindo Ashram, Pondicherry. 1972.

Upanishadic people
Characters in the Mahabharata